The central pygmy spiny-tailed skink (Egernia eos) is a species of large skink, a lizard in the family Scincidae. The species is native to western Australia.

References

Skinks of Australia
Egernia
Reptiles described in 2011
Taxa named by Paul Doughty
Taxa named by Luke Kealley
Taxa named by Steve Donnellan (scientist)